The Amtrak Standard Stations Program was an effort by Amtrak to create a standardized station design. The railroad launched the effort in 1978 to reduce costs, speed construction, and improve its corporate image.

Background 
When Amtrak was founded in 1971, it had no facilities beyond the station buildings and depots inherited from its constituent railroads. Many were in disrepair. Elsewhere, route realignments, ownership conflicts, or a lack of existing facilities required the construction of new station houses. Additionally, existing grand terminals in many large cities were larger than Amtrak needed and were expensive to retain. These reasons and others prompted the effort to provide those locations with more modern and appropriately sized facilities.

The first new station Amtrak built was Cincinnati River Road in 1973. Other early attempts by Amtrak to create a modest "modern" station design include the 1975 Richmond Staples Mill Road station and 1977 Cleveland Lakefront station. Amtrak president Paul Reistrup expressed a desire for Amtrak stations to look familiar in each locality.

Amtrak formally outlined its Standard Stations Program in its 1978 Standard Stations Program Executive Summary. The program was intended to amplify a sleek, modern image. It was also intended to foster a unified corporate identity through a consistent "look" and branding, with each standard station using not only one of several similar station building designs, but also the same interior and exterior finishes, signage, and seating. The program's manual outlined the reasoning of for such efforts.

Standard designs were seen as cost-efficient, as they would eliminate design costs that would otherwise be incurred with each and every station were they uniquely designed, and would also expedite construction.

This was not unprecedented. Past American railroads had sometimes built stations in similarly sized communities to a standardized size and design.

Station designs 

The station structures were intended to be functional, flexible, and cost-efficient. With spikes in ridership during the 1970s due to oil shortages, there was a perceived potential for permanent ridership gains. Therefore, Amtrak designed the stations to be easily expanded. End walls of the stations were designed to be able to be removed in order to build additions without incurring disruptions to the functioning of the stations.

Designs were mostly rectangular, and all except the largest model were one story. Walls were to be built of either textured, precast concrete panels, split concrete block or brick in what was described as a “play of bronze and tan” colors. A prominent cantilevered, flat black metal roof was to sit atop the buildings, with deep eaves to protect passengers from bad weather. Stations had floor-to-ceiling windows. Often, the top edge of the walls had a band of clerestory windows, which from a distance provided an optical illusion that the roof was floating above the station. The square footage and amenities of stations were to be determined by what their peak hour passenger count was.

Five initial standard station design models were presented with varying ideal sizes and intended capacities:
Type 300A
The largest model was designed to accommodate 300 or more passengers at a time. The two built examples of this design are the Miami and Midway stations.
Type 150B
a  station for a peak count of 150-300 passengers, on a  parcel
Type 50C and 50S
a  station for a peak count of 50-150 passengers, on a  parcel
Type 25D
a  station for a peak count of 25-50 passengers, on a  site
Type E
an unmanned station,  for a peak count of less than 25 passengers, ideally situated on a  parcel

Additional design types used included:
Expandable to accommodate more passengers. The design includes a small lounge, a baggage room, an office, and restrooms. Roughly half of its interior space dedicated to its waiting room.

Outcome 

Amtrak constructed standard stations in the 1970s and 1980s, but ultimately built relatively few of them. Strapped for funds, it instead gravitated towards either building even cheaper modular stations or seeking local funding for station development, in some cases even cooperating with private developers. Many "stations" opened in the 1980s and 1990s were very minimal, sometimes lacking any facilities besides a platform and appropriate signage or only featuring simple bus stop-style platform shelters. Many of the standard stations have been replaced with more modern intermodal facilities or by restored previous historic stations throughout the 2000s and 2010s.

List of standard stations

Related designs

Prototype designs 

 Catlettsburg station – opened 1975
 Cleveland Lakefront Station – opened 1977
 Poinciana station – opened 1974, closed 1975
 Richmond Staples Mill Road station – opened 1975

Stations with similar characteristics 
Carbondale station – opened 1981
Detroit Baltimore Street station – opened 1994
Du Quoin station – opened 1989
Newport News station – opened 1981
Richmond, California station – constructed 1978, replaced 1997
Trenton Transit Center – rebuilt 1986, replaced 2008

See also 
List of Amtrak stations
Amshack, derisive term occasionally applied to, among other stations, those of this sort

References 

Amtrak stations